
This is a list of players who graduated from the Nationwide Tour in 2009. The top 25 players on the Nationwide Tour's money list in 2009 earned their PGA Tour card for 2010.

*PGA Tour rookie in 2010
#Michael Sim received a battlefield promotion to the PGA Tour in 2009 by winning three tournaments on the Nationwide Tour in 2009. On the PGA Tour in 2009, he played in 3 tournaments and made 3 cuts, including one top 25.
T=tied
Green background indicates the player retained his PGA Tour card for 2011 (won finished inside the top 125).
Yellow background indicates the player did not retain his PGA Tour card for 2011, but retained conditional status (finished between 126–150).
Red background indicates the player did not retain his PGA Tour card for 2011 (finished outside the top 150).

Winners on the PGA Tour in 2010

Runners-up on the PGA Tour in 2010

See also
2009 PGA Tour Qualifying School graduates

External links
At a glance: 'The 25' who made the 2010 PGA Tour
Money list
Player profiles

Korn Ferry Tour
PGA Tour
Nationwide Tour Graduates
Nationwide Tour Graduates